Story of Ireland may refer to the following:

 The Story of Ireland - A 2011 documentary released by the British Broadcasting Corporation hosted by Fergal Keanne.
 Hibernia: The Story of Ireland - A new age album by the band Dagda.

See also 
 Irish short story